The 2019 WAC men's soccer tournament was the 12th edition of the tournament. It determined the Western Athletic Conference's automatic berth into the 2019 NCAA Division I men's soccer tournament. The tournament began on November 13 and concluded on November 17.

Grand Canyon were the defending champions, beating Seattle U last year. The Seattle U Redhawks won the title, earning their fourth ever WAC Championship, and their fourth ever appearance into the NCAA Tournament. Seattle's sophomore goalkeeper, Akili Kasim, won the Tournament MVP honors.

Background 

Grand Canyon Antelopes, who won the tournament after a 1–0 victory over San Jose State in the final. This was the first WAC men's soccer title for Grand Canyon, and the first for coach Schellas Hyndman.

Seeding 
The top seven teams qualified for the tournament.

Bracket

Results

First round

Semifinals

WAC Championship

All Tournament Team 

MVP in Bold

References

External links 
 2019 WAC Men's Soccer Tournament Home

2019 NCAA Division I men's soccer season
2019 in sports in Colorado
Wac Men's Soccer Tournament